Alfons Schöne was a German fencer. He competed in the individual sabre event at the 1900 Summer Olympics.

References

External links
 

Year of birth missing
Year of death missing
German male fencers
Olympic fencers of Germany
Fencers at the 1900 Summer Olympics